Behzadi is an Iranian last name originating from Iran meaning "born from a good origin".

Places
Behzadi, Iran, village in Howmeh Rural District, in the Central District of Behbahan County, Khuzestan Province, Iran
Behzadi-e Neqareh Khaneh, also known as Behzādī, village in Kabgian Rural District, Kabgian District, Dana County, Kohgiluyeh and Boyer-Ahmad Province, Iran
Deh Now-e Behzadi, village in Borj-e Akram Rural District, in the Central District of Fahraj County, Kerman Province, Iran

See also
Behzad Behzadi (1927–2008), Iranian lawyer, Azerbaijani language author
 Homayoun Behzadi, (born 1942) Iranian footballer and coach
Behzad (disambiguation)

Persian-language surnames